Competitor for  Canada

Hilda May Cameron (later Young, August 14, 1912 – April 24, 2001) was a Canadian athlete who competed mainly in the 100 metres. She was born and died in Toronto.

Cameron competed for Canada in the 1936 Summer Olympics held in Berlin, Germany in the 4 x 100 metres where she won the bronze medal with her teammates  Dorothy Brookshaw, Mildred Dolson and Aileen Meagher. In the 100 metre event she was eliminated in the first round. At the 1934 British Empire Games she finished fifth in the 220 yards competition.

References

1912 births
2001 deaths
Canadian female sprinters
Athletes from Toronto
Olympic track and field athletes of Canada
Athletes (track and field) at the 1936 Summer Olympics
Olympic bronze medalists for Canada
Commonwealth Games competitors for Canada
Athletes (track and field) at the 1934 British Empire Games
Medalists at the 1936 Summer Olympics
Olympic bronze medalists in athletics (track and field)
Olympic female sprinters